Rollis may refer to:

Christopher J. Rollis (1858-1930), American newspaper editor and politician
Rollis Township, Marshall County, Minnesota, United States